Jason Aeron Walter David  (born June 12, 1982) is a former American football cornerback in the National Football League (NFL). He was drafted by the Indianapolis Colts in the fourth round of the 2004 NFL Draft. Later, he would win Super Bowl XLI with the Colts, beating the Chicago Bears. He played college football at Washington State.

David also played for the New Orleans Saints and Detroit Lions.

College career
David grew up in Covina, California and attended Charter Oak High School before attending Washington State University on a football scholarship and majoring in communications. Jason went on to be a three-year letterman at Washington State. He was teammates with fellow cornerback Marcus Trufant and wide receiver Devard Darling.

Personal life
Jason David married Kristel Charlene. Their wedding was featured on season 5 of WE tv's "Platinum Weddings."

Professional career

Indianapolis Colts
David was a fourth round draft pick by the Indianapolis Colts in 2004. In 2004, he had 52 total tackles, 4 interceptions, and one forced fumble.  He also won a Super Bowl with the Colts in 2006 as a starter.

New Orleans Saints
On April 18, 2007, David signed a 4-year offer sheet with the New Orleans Saints that the Colts had 7 days to match. Indianapolis declined to match New Orleans' offer, and was awarded the Saints' 4th round draft pick as compensation.

He was waived on August 17, 2009.

Detroit Lions
David was signed by the Detroit Lions on November 3, 2009. He was waived on November 9, 2009.

References

External links

Indy Star Q&A with Jason
New Orleans Saints Bio
Jason David's Corner Foundation 
Reel Playmakers and S.T.A.R.S

1982 births
Living people
People from Covina, California
Sportspeople from Edmonton
Sportspeople from Los Angeles County, California
Players of American football from California
Canadian players of American football
American football cornerbacks
Washington State Cougars football players
Indianapolis Colts players
New Orleans Saints players
Detroit Lions players
Gridiron football people from Alberta